Schwaller is a surname. Notable people with the surname include:

Andi Schwaller (born 1970), Swiss curler 
Christof Schwaller, Swiss curler 
Heike Schwaller, Swiss curler 
Urs Schwaller, Swiss politician 
R. A. Schwaller de Lubicz (1887–1961), Alsatian scholar and writer